Sarvar can refer to:

 Sárvár, a town in Hungary
 Sárvár District 
 Sarvar, Bhopal, a village in Madhya Pradesh, India
 Sarvāṛ, a town in Rajasthan, India
 Sarvar Ikramov, Uzbekistani tennis player

See also
 Sarwar (disambiguation)